Artaphernes (Old Persian: Artafarna, from Median Rtafarnah), son of Artaphernes, was the nephew of Darius the Great, and a general of the Achaemenid Empire. He was a Satrap of Lydia from 492 to after 480.

He was appointed, together with Datis, to take command of the expedition sent by Darius to punish Athens and Eretria for their support for the Ionian Revolt. Artaphernes and Datis besieged and destroyed Eretria, Athenians fled so Persians burnt their city. Finally when most of the Persian fleet had gone back to Persia were beaten by the Athenians at the Battle of Marathon in 490 BC. 

Ten years later, Artaphernes is recorded as being in command of the Lydians and Mysians in the Second Persian invasion of Greece.

See also
Artaphernes
Greco-Persian Wars
Battle of Marathon
Darius I of Persia

References

Military leaders of the Achaemenid Empire
Battle of Marathon
Year of birth unknown
Year of death unknown
Achaemenid satraps of Lydia
Persian people of the Greco-Persian Wars
Achaemenid princes